Jean-Baptiste Juvénal Corbineau (1 August 1776, Marchiennes – 18 December 1848, Paris) was a French cavalry general of the French Revolutionary Wars and Napoleonic Wars. His two brothers Claude and Hercule also fought in both these wars and together the three men were known as "les trois Horaces" (the three Horatii).

External links
 Corbineau's biography at http://www.ecole-superieure-de-guerre.fr/

1776 births
1848 deaths
People from Marchiennes
Counts of the First French Empire
Members of the Chamber of Peers of the July Monarchy
French generals
French military personnel of the French Revolutionary Wars
French commanders of the Napoleonic Wars
Names inscribed under the Arc de Triomphe